Streptomyces jietaisiensis is an actinomycete, with tpe strain FXJ46T (=AS 4.1859T =JCM 12279T), first isolated from cypress forest soil in northern China.

References

Further reading
Whitman, William B., et al., eds. Bergey's manual of systematic bacteriology. Vol. 5. Springer, 2012.

External links

LPSN
Type strain of Streptomyces jietaisiensis at BacDive -  the Bacterial Diversity Metadatabase

jietaisiensis